Franchise Football League: Fantasy Football is a 1991 software published by Space Tech Enterprises.

Gameplay
Franchise Football League: Fantasy Football is a database program intended for running a fantasy football league.

Reception
Wyatt Lee and J.D. Lambright reviewed the program for Computer Gaming World, and stated that

Reviews
VideoGames & Computer Entertainment

References

1991 video games